Eoparargyractis is a genus of moths of the family Crambidae.

Species
Eoparargyractis floridalis Lange, 1956
Eoparargyractis irroratalis (Dyar, 1917)
Eoparargyractis plevie (Dyar, 1917)

References

 , 1956: A generic revision of the aquatic moths of North America: (Lepidoptera: Pyralidae, Nymphulinae). Wasman Journal of Biology, San Francisco 14  (1): 59–144. Full article: .

Acentropinae
Crambidae genera